The Federal University of Maranhão (UFMA) is a federal university in the northeastern state of Maranhão, Brazil.

External links 

 

Maranhao
Universities and colleges in Maranhão
1966 establishments in Brazil
Educational institutions established in 1966
São Luís, Maranhão